"Love on the Weekend" is the lead single from American musician John Mayer's seventh studio album The Search for Everything. The song premiered on November 17, 2016.

Live performance
On December 6, 2016, Mayer performed the song on The Tonight Show Starring Jimmy Fallon.

Reception
Rolling Stone Brittany Spanos said the song is "a return to Mayer's pop-rock roots while retaining a bit of bluesy flair Mayer cultivated on his last several studio albums". Robert Christgau highlighted the song in his review of the album The Search for Everything.

Personnel
 John Mayer – vocals, guitar, piano
 Steve Jordan – drums
 Pino Palladino – bass

Production
 Steve Jordan – executive producer
 Chad Franscoviak – executive producer, recording engineer
 Manny Marroquin – mixing engineer
 Chris Galland – mixing engineer
 Jeff Jackson – assistant engineer
 Robin Florent – assistant engineer
 Michelle Mancini – mastering engineer

Charts

Weekly charts

Year-end charts

Certifications

References

External links
 
 

2016 singles
2016 songs
American pop rock songs
John Mayer songs
Songs written by John Mayer